Sealion Cove is a cove off the Pacific Ocean in northwestern Kruzof Island in Southeast Alaska.  It is accessible by boat from the Pacific Ocean or by trail from Kalinin Bay off of Salisbury Sound.  It is about 40 km Northwest of Sitka and within the city's limits.

A hill near Sealion Cove is the site of the first Spanish territorial possession in Alaska.  On the 18th of August, 1775 Don Juan de la Bodega y Quadra named the cove Remedios and installed a cross as he was directed to do.  On the same day the Tlingit removed the cross and moved it to their lodging to keep.

References

Bays of Alaska
Bodies of water of Sitka, Alaska